Josephine Wilson, Baroness Miles (5 July 1904 – 7 November 1990) was a British stage and film actress. She was the wife of Bernard Miles and creator of the Molecule Club, which staged scientific shows for children at the Mermaid Theatre, a venue her husband had founded.

Selected filmography
 South Riding (1938) - Mrs. Holly
 The Lady Vanishes (1938) - Madame Kummer
 Life of St. Paul (1938) - Lydia
 The Four Feathers (1939) - Mrs. Brown - Sgt. Brown's wife (uncredited)
 Those Kids from Town (1942) - Mrs. Burns
 Uncensored (1943) - (uncredited)
 We Dive at Dawn (1943) - Alice Hobson (uncredited)
 The Adventures of Tartu (1943) - Nurse (uncredited)
 The Dark Tower (1943) - Dora Shogun
 Quiet Weekend (1946) - Mary Jarrow
 Chance of a Lifetime (1950) - Miss Cooper
 The End of the Affair (1955) - Miss Smythe

References

Bibliography
 Hare, William. Hitchcock and the Methods of Suspense. McFarland, 2007.

External links
 

1904 births
1990 deaths
British stage actresses
British film actresses
Miles
People from Bromley
Spouses of life peers